Onida is a city in and the county seat of Sully County, South Dakota, United States. The population was 658 as of the 2010 census.

History
Onida was founded in 1880 by settlers from Oneida, New York. It received its city rights in 1883.

Geography
Onida is located at  (44.705939, -100.066851).

Onida has been assigned the ZIP code 57564 and the FIPS place code 47180.

Climate

Demographics

2010 census
As of the census of 2010, there were 658 people, 280 households, and 186 families residing in the city. The racial makeup of the city was 95.4% White, 1.8% Native American, and 2.7% from two or more races. Hispanic or Latino people of any race were 0.8% of the population.

There were 280 households, of which 33.9% had children under the age of 18 living with them, 57.1% were married couples living together, 6.1% had a female householder with no husband present, 3.2% had a male householder with no wife present, and 33.6% were non-families. 30.4% of all households were made up of individuals, and 9.6% had someone living alone who was 65 years of age or older. The average household size was 2.35 and the average family size was 2.91.

The median age in the city was 42.7 years. 25.8% of residents were under the age of 18; 4.1% were between the ages of 18 and 24; 23.2% were from 25 to 44; 29.9% were from 45 to 64; and 17% were 65 years of age or older. The gender makeup of the city was 53.5% male and 46.5% female.

2000 census
As of the census of 2000, there were 740 people, 299 households, and 200 families residing in the city. The population density was 1,165.9 people per square mile (453.5/km2). There were 329 housing units at an average density of 518.3 per square mile (201.6/km2). The racial makeup of the city was 98.51% White, 0.54% Native American, and 0.95% from two or more races. Hispanic or Latino people of any race were 0.41% of the population.

There were 299 households, out of which 35.5% had children under the age of 18 living with them, 59.5% were married couples living together, 4.7% had a female householder with no husband present, and 32.8% were non-families. 28.8% of all households were made up of individuals, and 12.4% had someone living alone who was 65 years of age or older. The average household size was 2.47 and the average family size was 3.10.

In the city, the population was spread out, with 28.4% under the age of 18, 6.1% from 18 to 24, 29.2% from 25 to 44, 22.6% from 45 to 64, and 13.8% who were 65 years of age or older. The median age was 37 years. For every 100 females, there were 101.1 males. For every 100 females age 18 and over, there were 101.5 males.

The median income for a household in the city was $35,750, and the median income for a family was $44,583. Males had a median income of $27,692 versus $22,266 for females. The per capita income for the city was $19,340. About 5.0% of families and 5.2% of the population were below the poverty line, including 4.4% of those under age 18 and 11.8% of those age 65 or over.

Notable people
 Curt Byrum, professional golfer; has played on the PGA Tour and the Nationwide Tour; brother of Tom Byrum
 Tom Byrum, professional golfer; has played on the PGA Tour; brother of Curt Byrum
 Hubert W. Woodruff, Illinois state senator and lawyer; he was born in Onida.

See also
 List of cities in South Dakota

References

External links

 

Cities in South Dakota
Cities in Sully County, South Dakota
County seats in South Dakota
Populated places established in 1880
1880 establishments in Dakota Territory